This is a list of earthquakes in 1968. Only magnitude 6.0 or greater earthquakes appear on the list. Lower magnitude events are included if they have caused death, injury or damage. Events which occurred in remote areas will be excluded from the list as they wouldn't have generated significant media interest. All dates are listed according to UTC time. Maximum intensities are indicated on the Mercalli intensity scale and are sourced from United States Geological Survey (USGS) ShakeMap data. There was a large resurgence in activity in 1968. 22 magnitude 7.0+ earthquakes struck various parts of the planet. The largest of these was a magnitude 8.2 event in Japan in May. Large aftershocks struck the area following the mainshock. New Zealand and Indonesia had some upheaval during the year. The high activity contributed to over 12,000 deaths across the world. The vast majority of this total was caused by a destructive event in Iran in August with nearly 10,500 deaths. Events in the Philippines, Italy and Indonesia also had significant fatalities.

Overall

By death toll 

 Note: At least 10 casualties

By magnitude 

 Note: At least 7.0 magnitude

Notable events

January

February

March

April

May

June

July

August

September

October

November

December

References

1968
 
1968